Gunnampalli is a village in West Godavari district of Andhra Pradesh in India. Pulla and Kaikaram railway Station are the nearest railway stations.

Geography 

It is located in Dwarkatirumala mandal, on a hilly terrain.

Demographics 

 Census of India, Gunnampalle had a population of 4951. The total population constitute, 2504 males and 247 females with a sex ratio of 977 females per 1000 males. 469 children are in the age group of 0–6 years, with sex ratio of 946. The average literacy rate stands at 72.29%.

References

Villages in West Godavari district